David ben Joseph Pardo (c. 1591 – 1657) was a Dutch rabbi and hakham. He was born at Salonica to Rabbi Joseph and Reina in the second half of the sixteenth century. He went with his father to Amsterdam, where he became hakham of the Bet Yisrael congregation (founded 1618). This congregation was consolidated in 1639  with the other two congregations in Amsterdam, and Pardo was appointed hakham together with Isaac Aboab da Fonseca, Menasseh Ben Israel, and Saul Levi Morteira. He was also a trustee of the Jewish cemetery and hazzan of the Bikkur Holim organization. In 1625 he founded the Honen Dallim benevolent society.

In 1610, Pardo published in Amsterdam a transcription in Latin characters of Zaddik ben Joseph Formon's Obligacion de los Coraçones, a translation of the Hobot ha-Lebabot into Judaeo-Spanish.

On September 16, 1619, he married Rachel Sanchez (born 1595 at Moura, Portugal). They had three children: Joseph (c. 1624 – 1677), Josiah (1626-1684), and Sarah. Josiah Pardo served as a Rabbi in Curaçao and in Port Royal, Jamaica and was one of the first Rabbis in the New World.

Pardo died at Amsterdam on March 15, 1657 (Rosh Chodesh Nisan, 5417 A.M.) and is buried at Beth Haim of Ouderkerk aan de Amstel.

References 

1590s births
1657 deaths
Year of birth uncertain
Burials in North Holland
17th-century Dutch rabbis
Dutch Sephardi Jews
Hazzans
Rabbis from Thessaloniki
Sephardi rabbis